This is a list of hockey grounds in India that have been used for major hockey matches.

Stadium

Hockey World Cup 

This is a list of Hockey grounds in India that have been used for Hockey World Cup. Till date India has hosted three World Cup in 1982 2010 and in 2018

1982 Hockey World Cup

2010 Hockey World Cup

2018 Men's Hockey World Cup

2023 Men's Hockey World Cup

FIH Hockey World League

2015 Hockey World League And 2017 Hockey World League 

This is a list of Hockey grounds in India that have been used for FIH Hockey World League. India will host  is the second edition of the FIH Hockey World League field hockey championship for men. The tournament will start in 2014 and is scheduled to finish in December 2015. India will also host FIH Hockey World League final men 2017 in Kalinga stadium Bhubaneswar.

See also 

 List of cricket grounds in India
 List of stadiums in India
 List of international cricket grounds in India
 List of Field hockey venues in India 
 List of football stadiums in India
 Venues of the 2010 Commonwealth Games

References

External links
 www.sangamnersports.8m.com
 india.cricketworld4u.com

 
Lists of sports venues in India
India venues